Theodore Peter James Kinnaird Taptiklis (born 16 December 1984), known professionally as Theo James, is an English actor. He is best known for portraying Tobias "Four" Eaton in The Divergent Series film trilogy. He has starred in the horror films Underworld: Awakening (2012) and Underworld: Blood Wars (2016) and the science fiction film Archive (2020). In television, he has appeared in the crime drama series Golden Boy (2012), the romance series The Time Traveler's Wife (2022), and the dark comedy series The White Lotus (2022), for which he received a Screen Actors Guild Award.

Early life
Theodore Peter James Kinnaird Taptiklis was born in High Wycombe on 16 December 1984. He is the son of Philip Taptiklis, a business consultant, and Jane (née Martin), who worked for the National Health Service. He is of Greek and Scottish descent. He has two older brothers and two older sisters.

James was raised in Askett. He attended Aylesbury Grammar School and went on to earn his undergraduate degree in philosophy from the University of Nottingham. He trained at the Bristol Old Vic Theatre School.

Career
In 2010, James made his television debut in two episodes of A Passionate Woman. The same year he played Turkish diplomat Kemal Pamuk in an episode of the first season of Downton Abbey. His film credits include You Will Meet a Tall Dark Stranger (2010). James was cast in Stranger while still in his final year at drama school. He was named a "Star of Tomorrow" in 2009 by Screen International.

In 2011, James starred in the short-lived horror series Bedlam, playing the lead role of Jed Harper. James played James, an obnoxious night club rep, in the British comedy The Inbetweeners Movie (2011).

In 2012, James appeared in the miniseries Room at the Top as Jack Wales and ITV's Case Sensitive as Aiden Harper. He was in the films The Domino Effect (2012) and Underworld: Awakening (2012), playing the role of David in the latter opposite Kate Beckinsale. He reprised his character David in the fifth Underworld film, as the film's male lead. James starred as Detective Walter William Clark Jr. in the American crime-drama series Golden Boy (2013), which aired for one season.

James' breakthrough role was his portrayal of Tobias "Four" Eaton in Divergent (2014), the film adaptation based on the New York Times bestselling novels by Veronica Roth. James reprised the character in the sequel, The Divergent Series: Insurgent (2015). He returned in one more Divergent film, The Divergent Series: Allegiant (2016).

James starred alongside Amber Heard, Billy Bob Thornton and Jim Sturgess in the film adaptation of London Fields, and in the indie drama The Benefactor (2015), with Richard Gere and Dakota Fanning. James executive produced and starred as Michael in Backstabbing for Beginners (2018). He starred as Will Younger in the Netflix film How It Ends (2018).

In 2019, James executive produced and played Sidney Parker in the British series Sanditon as a male lead. It is an eight-part period-drama adaptation of Jane Austen's final novel, written only months before her death in 1817. James will not reprise his role for the series' second and third seasons. He then executive produced and starred in the film Lying and Stealing. James launched his own film and TV production company, named Untapped, that same year.

James produced and appeared in the 2020 science fiction film Archive, playing a robotics scientist working on a secret project involving building a prototype based on his dead wife. He stars in the romance series The Time Traveler's Wife, which premiered in May 2022. The Hollywood Reporters Angie Han described James's portrayal of the titular time traveler "dashing and a little sardonic" and highlighted his and co-star Rose Leslie's "inability to generate any real sparks between them". James plays a series regular role in the second season of the satire series The White Lotus.

Personal life
James is married to Irish actress Ruth Kearney. The two met at the Bristol Old Vic Theatre School. They divide their time between Venice Beach, California and North London. They have a daughter, born in 2021.

Outside his acting career, James was the singer and guitarist of the London-based band Shere Khan, which disbanded in 2012. In 2015, he became the brand ambassador for Hugo Boss fragrances for men, appearing in print ads and commercials.

In June 2016, James travelled to Greece with UNHCR, where he met Syrian refugees and learned more about their situation. He has since been a supporter of refugees' rights and called for greater humanitarian aid for people displaced by the Syrian Civil War.

Filmography

Awards and nominations

References

External links

 

1984 births
20th-century English male actors
21st-century English male actors
Alumni of Bristol Old Vic Theatre School
Alumni of the University of Nottingham
English expatriates in the United States
English male film actors
English male television actors
English people of Greek descent
English people of Scottish descent
English people of New Zealand descent
Living people
Male actors from Bristol
People from High Wycombe
People educated at Aylesbury Grammar School
Actors from Oxford
Male actors from Buckinghamshire
Actors from Oxfordshire